Chen Jiau-hua (born 29 October 1959) is a Taiwanese conservationist and politician. She won the 2020 legislative elections as a member of the New Power Party. Chen served as leader of the New Power Party from 10 November 2020.

Political career

In November 2019, Chen accepted a nomination from the New Power Party to contest the 2020 election as an at-large legislative candidate. She was ranked first on the NPP party list. The New Power Party won over seven percent of the party list vote, allowing three at-large legislative candidates to take office. On 10 November 2020, Chen was subsequently elected party chairman, succeeding Kao Yu-ting.

References

1979 births
21st-century Taiwanese women politicians
Living people
New Power Party chairpersons
Members of the 10th Legislative Yuan
Party List Members of the Legislative Yuan
New Power Party Members of the Legislative Yuan
Taiwanese expatriates in the United States
Kaohsiung Medical University alumni
National Tsing Hua University alumni
Tainan Members of the Legislative Yuan